The Rückenfigur (literally "back-figure") is a compositional device in painting, graphic art, photography and film. A person is seen from behind in the foreground of the image, contemplating the view before them, and is a means by which the viewer can identify with the image's figure and then recreate the space to be conveyed. It is commonly associated with German Romantic painting and particularly the landscape painter Caspar David Friedrich. 

The Rückenfigur motif dates to antiquity and has since been employed in many different eras and styles of art. Before Friedrich, such figures were not generally the subject of the work. Giotto's Lamentation of Christ (1300s) is any early example of non-subject figures turned from the viewer. The Rückenfigur may also take the form of staffage. The trope commonly appears in advertisements.

Gallery

References 

Artistic techniques
Composition in visual art